South Carolina elected its members October 12–13, 1818.

See also 
 1818 South Carolina's 6th congressional district special election
 1818 and 1819 United States House of Representatives elections
 List of United States representatives from South Carolina

Notes 

1818
South Carolina
United States House of Representatives